Blacksmith (Amunet Black) is a DC Comics supervillain and a rogue to the Flash III (Wally West). Blacksmith first appeared in Flash: Iron Heights (2001) and was created by Geoff Johns and Ethan Van Sciver. She is the ex-wife of Goldface.

Amunet Black made her live action debut as a recurring character on the fourth season of The Flash, portrayed by Katee Sackhoff.

Fictional character biography
For 15 years, Amunet Black has been running and operating the Network, an underground black market in Central City and Keystone City, the twin cities, for supervillains to buy, sell, or move contraband. During that time, she had a brief marriage to Goldface. When they divorced, she stole the elixir that gave him his powers and changed it to gain the ability to merge metal with flesh and shape it to her will. She was able to keep the Network hidden from the authorities and if any villain reformed or quit crime, she made sure the memories of the Network were erased from their minds. Soon, with a vision of power, Blacksmith planned out her takeover of the twin cities, with her as the leader.

First, she organized a new group of Rogues, which consisted of the Weather Wizard, the Mirror Master III, Magenta, Murmur, Girder, Plunder, and the Trickster II. She made sure that her Rogues were strong and had better control of their powers. She had Magenta use her powers to keep Girder from rusting and taught the Weather Wizard better control of his wand.

Second, she and her Rogues had the Flash's allies removed or incapacitated. The Mirror Master III framed the Pied Piper for the murder of his parents. Plunder took out Chunk, shot his mirror image Detective Jared Morillo, and assumed his identity. Then, the Mirror Master III kidnapped Cyborg and police officer Fred Chyre, trapping them in a mirror universe along with all the other cops of Keystone City. The Rogues then removed the speedsters by giving Jesse Quick's company financial trouble and then sent Jay Garrick to a hospital in Denver when his wife got sick. Finally, Murmur and the Mirror Master III attacked radio stations and reprogrammed their antennas to broadcast a mirror shield around the twin cities to prevent anyone from coming in or going out. After everything had been put into place, Blacksmith and her Rogues launched their takeover and began by attacking the Flash. They attacked hard and fast, which left the Flash tired and badly injured, but just as they were about to finish him off, they were stopped by the Thinker, who wanted to use the Flash's brain to upload information. After the Thinker was defeated, Blacksmith and the rogues resumed their plan and attacked the Flash and Goldface. They successfully trounced the Flash while Goldface escaped. During the fight, Blacksmith used her power to transform her body into ebony metal, while villains in the Network began to loot and pillage the two cities. Luckily, Goldface led the people of the twin cities against the Network and the Flash managed to defeat the Weather Wizard, the Mirror Master III, and the Trickster II, before they escaped when Captain Cold froze the ground and the Mirror Master II used it to retreat. With her Rogues defeated, she tried a desperate attack by collapsing the bridge that connects Keystone City and Central City. The Flash quickly managed to rebuild the bridge and finally defeat Blacksmith by stranding her on a barge in the middle of the river (she could not enter the water for fear of rusting her metal skin). With her Network discontinued, she was sent to Iron Heights, where she was severely wounded by the escaping Gorilla Grodd.

Although she survived her injuries, Blacksmith has not been seen since that incident, although she did show up for "Digger" Harkness' funeral.

Powers and abilities
Blacksmith's body has been mutated to be the perfect fusion between organic and inorganic. This has given her the ability to fuse organic and inorganic matter. Blacksmith has used the ability to fuse an inorganic object into an opponent causing serious damage. Blacksmith has also used the ability to cause serious damage to inorganic structures.

In other media
A variation of Amunet Black appears in The Flash, portrayed by Katee Sackhoff. This version is a former flight attendant named Leslie Jocoy. After gaining the power to telekinetically manipulate anything made of alnico, Jocoy began carrying a quantity of alnico shards, took on the alias of "Amunet Black", and became a crime lord specializing in black market metahuman trafficking. Additionally, she is the ex-girlfriend of fellow crime lord Goldface.

References

External links
 Profile from "The Flash: Those Who Ride The Lightning" website
 Crimson Lightning  - An online index to the comic book adventures of the Flash.

Characters created by Geoff Johns
Comics characters introduced in 2001
DC Comics female supervillains
DC Comics cyborgs
DC Comics metahumans
Flash (comics) characters
Fictional inventors